Reva: A Journey Within is a 2018 Gujarati adventure drama film starring Chetan Dhanani and Monal Gajjar produced by Brainbox Studios and Baroda Talkies. The film is based on Gujarati author Dhruv Bhatt's 1998 Gujarati novel Tatvamasi. The film was directed by Rahul Bhole and Vinit Kanojia. It was released on 6 April 2018 to highly positive critic reviews praising performances of cast, story and cinematography and positive commercial acclaim too. The film won the National Film Award for Best Feature Film in Gujarati.

Plot 
Karan is a spoiled rich 25-year-old American NRI who has an extravagant life with his needs being at the centre of his world. His grandfather passes away and leaves all his wealth in his will to a charity, an Ashram located at the banks of the Narmada river in India. The only way he could get his wealth back was to convince the Ashram to sign a No Objection Certificate. Thus, Karan embarks on a journey to the remote Ashram with little expectation of the adventures he was about to encounter that would set in motion events beyond his control.

Cast
 Chetan Dhanani as Karan 
 Monal Gajjar as Supriya 
 Yatin Karyekar as Shashtriji 
 Muni Jha as Lawyer 
 Daya Shankar Pandey as Gandu Fakir 
 Sejal Shah as Vanita (Supriya's mother) 
 Abhinay Banker as Banga 
 Atul Mahale as Bittu 
 Subhash Brahmbhatt as Dada 
 Firoz Bhagat as Mehta Uncle 
 Rupa Borgaonkar as Puriya 
 Prashant Barot as Guptaji 
 Malhar Thakar - Special appearance as Parikramavasi

Production 
The film is based on Gujarati author Dhruv Bhatt's 1998 Gujarati novel Tatvamasi. The directors found the number of characters and the philosophy of novel challenging to adapt for the film. The author had permitted them for changes. The screenplay was written by the directors. The film was shot at 15 different locations in Gujarat (GJ) and Madhya Pradesh (MP), most on the banks of river Narmada, including Bhedaghat, Gaurighat, Maheshwar Ghat and Mangrol. Some scenes were shot at Polo Forest and inside Naida Caves on the Diu island.

Soundtrack

Release 
The film was released on 6 April 2018 across Gujarat and Maharashtra.

Reception
The film opened to the positive reviews. Shruti Jambhekar of The Times of India giving in 4.5 out of 5. She praised story and adaptation, performances and cinematography. DeshGujarat also give it 4.5 out of 5 and also praised its music. Ketan Mistry writing for Chitralekha magazine also praised the adaptation.

The film won National Film Award for Best Feature Film in Gujarati at the 66th National Film Awards.

References

External links
 

Films shot in Gujarat
Films shot in Madhya Pradesh
Narmada River
Indian adventure drama films
2010s adventure drama films
2010s Gujarati-language films
2018 drama films